Gilia tweedyi, or Tweedy's gilia, is an annual plant in the phlox family. It is native to the northwestern United States.

Taxonomy
Gilia tweedyi was described and published in 1905 by Per Axel Rydberg, who named it in honor of Frank Tweedy, one of the earliest collectors. Rydberg's type description is based on Tweedy's specimen #4422, deposited at the New York Botanical Garden's Steere Herbarium.

In his description, Rydberg noted the similarity of Gilia tweedyi to Gilia inconspicua and Gilia minutiflora. "From the former it differs in the smaller corolla, of which not only the corolla-tube but also the throat is included in the calyx; from the latter it differs in the pinnatifid leaves." But the similarities would lead to taxonomic revision, with Gilia tweedy temporarily demoted to subspecific status.

In 1907, August Brand published Gilia minutiflora var. tweedyi. In 1959, Arthur Cronquist created Gilia sinuata var. tweedyi (formerly Gilia inconspicua var. sinuata), and then Gilia inconspicua var. tweedyi in 1984. These subspecific taxa are no longer recognized; Gilia tweedy is the currently accepted name.

Description
Height and branching are quite variable, probably dependent on habitat conditions. Stems and leaves have distinctive cottony or cobwebby hairs, and are glandular, more so in the upper part of the plant. Flowers are in an open inflorescence (or flowers single to few in small individuals), the corollas (united petals) funnelform, blue with a yellow throat, the tube to 5 mm long with short lobes.

Distribution
Gilia tweedyi is native to the northwestern US, from Oregon through central Idaho east to Montana, and south to northeast Nevada, Wyoming and northwest Colorado.

Conservation status
Tweedy's gilia is ranked G4, i.e., apparently secure globally. It is of state conservation concern in Montana and Wyoming.

History
Gilia tweedyi was named by Per Axel Rydberg in honor of botanist Frank Tweedy, who made several of the earliest collections, one of which (#4422) was the basis for Rydberg's type description. At the time, Tweedy was working as a topographer for the US Geological Survey. The type specimen was collected in 1901, from a river bottom near Encampment, Wyoming, at 7200 ft elevation. Earlier collections made by Aven Nelson, Professor of Botany at the University of Wyoming, in 1898 in southern Wyoming, and by Tweedy in 1900 in the Bighorn Mountains, Wyoming, are paratypes.

References

tweedyi
Flora of the United States